The Hizon-Ocampo House is a heritage house in the City of San Fernando, Pampanga. 

The house was first residence of Anacleto Hizon and Victoria Singian de Miranda. It was inherited by their daughter Leoncia Hizon who was married to Basilio Ocampo, gobernadorcillo of San Fernando. Among their children was renowned architect Fernando H. Ocampo.

Buildings and structures in San Fernando, Pampanga
Cultural Properties of the Philippines
Landmarks in the Philippines
Heritage Houses in the Philippines